Polymer Journal is the official journal of the Society of Polymer Science, Japan (SPSJ) and publishes original articles, notes, short communications and reviews on developments in macromolecule research. It is an international peer-reviewed journal that is published on a monthly basis. The current Editor-in-Chief is Keiji Tanaka of Kyushu University, Japan.

References

External links
 Polymer Journal Official Website

Chemistry journals
English-language journals
Monthly journals
Publications established in 1970
Nature Research academic journals